The Metropolitan Asylums Board (MAB) was established under Poor Law legislation to deal with London's sick and poor. It was established by the Metropolitan Poor Act 1867 and dissolved in 1930, when its functions were transferred to the London County Council.

The Act was passed following a campaign by Florence Nightingale and Edwin Chadwick and the health section of the National Association for the Promotion of Social Science and some well-publicised deaths of paupers in workhouses. The President of the Poor Law Board, Mr Gathorne Hardy in September 1866, instructed two doctors to visit London workhouses with a view to procuring information which might assist him in drafting new legislation for the reform of workhouse infirmaries. There was a particular concern that those suffering from infectious fevers and smallpox, and the insane, should be removed from the workhouses and treated in separate hospitals.

The area it covered was the Metropolitan Asylums District which included the metropolis as defined by the Metropolis Management Act 1855, excluding the hamlet of Penge.

Despite its name, the MAB was not involved in providing care for the mentally ill. During its lifetime, it set up around forty institutions, beginning with three hospitals for smallpox and fever cases, and two large asylums for what were then termed 'imbeciles' – people with severe learning difficulties.

See also
 Leavesden Hospital
 South Eastern Hospital

References

External links
History of the MAB
List of MAB Institutions
London Metropolitan Archives.

English Poor Laws
1930 disestablishments in England
1867 establishments in England
19th century in London
Former mental health organisations in the United Kingdom
Defunct organisations based in London
Health in London
20th century in London